Brrar is a village in the former municipality of Dajt in Tirana County, Albania. At the 2015 local government reform, it became part of the Tirana municipality.

References

Populated places in Tirana
Villages in Tirana County